Fosset may refer to:

Fosset, Belgium, village in Belgium
André Fosset, previous French Environment minister

See also
 Fossett